is a Japanese marathon runner. He came to prominence after running the 2011 Tokyo Marathon in 2:08:37, finishing as the first Japanese citizen and third overall. He was known as the "citizen runner" given that he used to work full-time for the government of Saitama Prefecture and trained in his time off with his own expenses without any sponsorship. Kawauchi won the 2018 Boston Marathon. In 2020, he left his job in local government and became a full-time professional runner.

Kawauchi is a frequent competitor, entering many races each year (averaging a marathon per month) ranging in distance from the 1500 m to the 50 km ultramarathon. Among his better performances are victories at the Boston Marathon, the Hokkaido Marathon and the Beppu-Ōita Marathon and top-three finishes at the Tokyo Marathon and Fukuoka Marathon (the two most important marathons in Japan). His personal best for the distance is 2:07:27 (Lake Biwa 2021). Guinness World Records has recognized Kawauchi for becoming the first person to run more than 100 sub-2:20 marathons.

In spite of being an amateur, he has represented Japan internationally at the World Championships in Athletics and the IAAF World Half Marathon Championships. He has two younger brothers, Yoshiki and Koki Kawauchi, who are also marathon runners.

Career

Early years
Born in Setagaya, Tokyo, Kawauchi began running from a young age: first he practiced with his mother and later with the track teams at high school. While he was there, the combination of an injury and the premature death of his father limited his running. Nevertheless, he continued to enjoy the sport at a lower level while studying at Gakushuin University. After graduation, he did not receive much interest from corporate running teams–-the typical route to professional running in Japan. He decided to continue running for pleasure, entering races and paying his own expenses.

He finished third at the 2008 Ageo Half Marathon in a time of 1:03:22 and began to compete in marathons the following year. He gradually improved his times in 2009. In his debut at the Beppu-Ōita Marathon , he finished 20th in 2:19:26. He bettered this with a time of 2:18:18 for 19th at the Tokyo Marathon a month later, then managed 13th at the Fukuoka Marathon in December in a time of 2:17:33. He began to break into the upper echelons of the national scene at the 2010 Tokyo Marathon, where he claimed fourth place in a personal-best time of 2:12:36. Despite this improvement, he was further down the field at the Fukuoka race, finishing tenth in 2:17:54.

2011 season
Kawauchi improved his half-marathon best to 1:02:40 at the Kagawa Marugame Half Marathon in February 2011, finishing in the top 10. He set his sights on a top-eight finish at the Tokyo Marathon later that month but exceeded his own expectations by running a time of 2:08:37 and taking third place. As the best Japanese performer, he earned selection for the 2011 World Championships in Athletics.

In June, he entered the Okinoshima Ultramarathon and led the 50 km race right up to the last 600 metres, at which point he collapsed due to heat stroke. He failed to finish. At the World Championship Marathon held in Daegu he finished 18th-–a performance that helped the Japanese team including Hiroyuki Horibata and Kentaro Nakamoto to a silver medal in the 2011 World Marathon Cup. He competed extensively toward the end of the year and his form held: he managed fourth at the Osaka Marathon, then took third at the Fukuoka Marathon. The latter was an Olympic qualifying race, and he was the highest-finishing Japanese. The Japan Association of Athletics Federations played down his selection choices, saying that his time of 2:09:57 was not fast enough, but Kawauchi upturned tradition by saying the race was a warm-up for the second qualifier in Tokyo. (Japanese runners rarely enter both selection races due to their proximity in the running calendar.) Only two weeks later, Kawauchi entered the Hofu Marathon and was runner-up behind Mongolia's Serod Bat-Ochir. He remarked that the fatigue from the previous race had hurt his chances of winning.

2012 season

At the start of 2012, Kawauchi ran a half-marathon best of 1:02:18 in Marugame, but his unorthodox decision to race frequently ruined his chances of Olympic selection, as he finished fourteenth with a time of 2:12:51 at February's Tokyo Marathon. He called his own performance "disgraceful" and shaved his head to make amends for disappointing his supporters. This did not deter Kawauchi from following his own running plan, however, and he entered nine marathons that year, winning five of them. He took the top honors at the Kasumigaura Marathon, Hokkaido Marathon, Sydney Marathon, Chiba Aqualine Marathon and Hofu Marathon. Kawauchi's return to Okinoshima produced a course-record victory in 2:51:45 at the 50 km race. On top of his marathon running, Kawauchi ran six half-marathons, including top-three finishes in Shizuoka and Ageo as well as 21st place at the 2012 IAAF World Half Marathon Championships. Following the advice of the late New Zealand running coach Arthur Lydiard, he said that focusing on distance work would improve his speed, rather than the inverse speed training favored by his contemporaries. Demonstrating this philosophy, he ran personal bests for the 1500 meters and the 5000 meters in September, recording times of 3:50.51 and 13:58.62 at a Nittai University track meet.

Kawauchi's fastest marathon time of the year was 2:10:29, which earned him sixth place at the Fukuoka Marathon. Repeating his schedule from the previous year, he ran in Hofu two weeks later; this time he won the race. His 2:10:46 gave him the record for the shortest period of time between two sub-2:11 marathons by any runner. Responding to questions about his frequent racing, he said that he wanted "to find out whether the common sense of the running world is really any kind of sense at all."

2013 season

The organizers of the 2013 Egyptian Marathon agreed to pay his travel expenses for the January race, but Kawauchi missed his flight after arriving at the airport without his passport. He decided to pay 800,000 yen (US$9,000) for a replacement flight – an amount that equated to a quarter of his yearly salary. The decision paid off as he reached the starting line for the marathon and won with a time of 2:12:24—the fastest ever for a race in Egypt. Less than three weeks later he ran at the Beppu-Ōita Marathon and reached the top of the Japanese rankings by winning the race in a personal best of 2:08:15, breaking Gert Thys's 17-year-old course record in the process. In spite of the many races, his passion was not dimmed: "after 21 Marathon runs, I can now say with confidence how fun Marathon running can be". He beat a number of professional runners at the Kumanichi 30 km Road Race two weeks later, finishing in 1:29:31—another course record and a personal-best time. The race organizers said a 30,000 increase in spectators that year was due to Kawauchi's popularity with the Japanese public: the runner had received invitations to more than 100 races.

Kawauchi achieved further success in 2013. He broke his personal best by one second with a fourth-place finish at the Seoul International Marathon. Cold conditions at the Nagano Marathon put a stop to an attempt to be the first person to run three sub-2:09 marathons in consecutive months, but he still managed to win the race, becoming the first Japanese winner since 1999. He equalled Nicholas Manza's course record to win the Gold Coast Marathon in July.

2018 Boston Marathon
Kawauchi won the 2018 Boston Marathon with a time of 2:15:58, becoming the first Japanese winner since 1987. After leading early at world record pace and repeatedly surging throughout the race, at mile 25 Kawauchi passed defending champion Geoffrey Kirui to achieve his first major marathon win. He overcame extremely difficult weather conditions, including heavy rain, strong headwinds, and temperatures near  throughout the race. Despite this, he attributed his victory to those conditions, stating that "for me, these are the best conditions possible."  Kawauchi's Boston win was his world record 79th marathon under 2:20:00. After returning to Japan following his Boston Marathon win, Kawauchi told reporters that he would quit his job as a high school administration office worker and turn pro in April 2019.

International competitions

Half Marathon Results

Marathon results

Ultramarathon Results

Personal bests
1500 metres - 3:50.51 (2012)
5000 metres - 13:58.62 (2012)
10,000 metres - 29:02.33 (2010)
10 km - 28:53 (2022)
10 miles - 47:28 (2014)
20 km - 59:17 (2013)
Half Marathon - 1:02:13 (2022) 
30 km - 1:29:31 (2013)
Marathon -	2:07:27 (2021)
50 km - 2:44:07 (2016) NR

World records
Shortest period of time (2 weeks) between two sub-2:10 marathons - 2:09:05 (2013), 2:09:15 (2014) 
Shortest period of time (6 weeks) between two sub-2:09 marathons - 2:08:15, 2:08:14 (2013)
Most sub-2:16 marathons in one calendar year: 12 times (2014), (2017)
Most career sub-2:11 marathons: 23 times 
Most career sub-2:20 marathons: 101 times
Most career sub-3:00 50 km ultra marathons: 8 times
Half marathon in a three-piece suit (uncertified course) - 1:06:42 (2016)

Personal life
Kawauchi married fellow runner Yuko Mizuguchi in May 2019, about two weeks after they both won their gender class in the Vancouver Marathon.

Kawauchi has two younger brothers. He started running at the age of 7, by his mother Mika who used to run 800m and 1500m as a middle and high school student.

References

External links

JAAF profile 

1987 births
Living people
People from Setagaya
Athletes from Tokyo
Japanese ultramarathon runners
Japanese male long-distance runners
Japanese male marathon runners
Male ultramarathon runners
Asian Games bronze medalists for Japan
Asian Games medalists in athletics (track and field)
Athletes (track and field) at the 2014 Asian Games
Medalists at the 2014 Asian Games
World Athletics Championships athletes for Japan
Japan Championships in Athletics winners
Boston Marathon male winners
20th-century Japanese people
21st-century Japanese people